This is a list of awards and nominations received by Indian American film director, screenwriter, author, producer, and actor M. Night Shyamalan.

Major associations

Academy Awards

BAFTA Awards

Golden Globe Awards

Other awards and nominations

Amanda Awards

Annie Awards

Bram Stoker Awards

Chicago Film Critics Association Awards

Chlotrudis Awards

Christopher Awards

Directors Guild of America Awards

Empire Awards

Fangoria Chainsaw Awards

Golden Raspberry Awards

Hugo Awards

Nebula Awards

Online Film Critics Society Awards

Palm Springs International Film Festival

Rondo Hatton Classic Horror Awards

Satellite Awards

Saturn Awards

SFX Awards

ShoWest Convention

Stinkers Bad Movie Awards

Writers Guild of America Awards

External links
 

Awards
Shyamalan, M. Night